Henry Ryder Locke Bill (March 27, 1870 – December 16, 1942) was a Canadian politician. He represented the electoral district of Shelburne in the Nova Scotia House of Assembly from 1928 to 1941. He was a member of the Nova Scotia Liberal Party.

Born in 1870 at Lockeport, Nova Scotia, Bill was a wholesale fish merchant by career. He married Ida L. Silver in 1895. Bill served as mayor of Lockeport from 1905 to 1912 and 1919–1924. Bill also served as a member of the Royal Fisheries Commission from 1927 to 1928.

Bill entered provincial politics in 1928, when he was elected in the dual-member Shelburne riding with Liberal Wishart McLea Robertson. He was re-elected in the now single-member Shelburne riding in the 1933 election. In the 1937 election, Bill was re-elected, defeating former Conservative MLA Norman Emmons Smith by 926 votes. He did not reoffer in the 1941 election. Bill died on December 16, 1942, at Lockeport.

References

1870 births
1942 deaths
Mayors of places in Nova Scotia
Nova Scotia Liberal Party MLAs
People from Shelburne County, Nova Scotia